Middlefield Township may refer to the following townships in the United States:

 Middlefield Township, Geauga County, Ohio
 Middlefield Township, Buchanan County, Iowa